"Five in a Row" was a 1989 single by Australian comedy team, The D-Generation. It was released in November 1989 and reached a peak position of number 12 on the ARIA Singles Chart. It was co-written by The D-Generation members, Santo Cilauro, Tony Martin, Rob Sitch, and Tom Gleisner. Music written and produced by Colin Setches and John Grant.

The song and its accompanying music video parodied five Australian musicians: John Farnham (played by Rob Sitch), Jimmy Barnes (played by Santo Cilauro), Kylie Minogue (played by Jane Kennedy), Little River Band, and James Reyne (played by John Harrison). On the recording, the voice of Farnham was taken by a very young Jack Jones (Irwin Thomas), the voice of Barnes was John Brown, all of LRB's voices were Colin Setches, with Jane Kennedy doing Kylie, and John Harrison singing James Reyne. Drums by Angus Burchall (Farnham band), bass by Roger McLachlan (LRB, Pyramid, Farnham), guitars by Irwin Thomas, and all keyboards, programming and arrangements by John Grant. Recorded at AAV Studio 1, South Melbourne, engineered, mixed and co-produced by Ross Cockle.

Track listing
 "Five in a Row"	
 "Pissweak Quiz Show Sketch"

Charts

Certification

References

1989 singles
Comedy songs
1989 songs
Mushroom Records singles